Phantom Suite is the first jazz album released by The Jazz Police, with Tamara Wimer as singer. This album was recorded in Seattle, and was released on DB Records, a subsidiary of Universal Music Group. It was produced by Daniel Barry, and released on June 4, 2002. The recording process took over ten years, and a second version, titled Red Fish Blue Fish, was also released

Track listing
Phantom Suite - "Phantom Suite"
"S1m0ne"
"Baby Weezer"
"Madama Butterfly"
"East Palm Drive"
"Will to power"
"Peasants Lullabye"
"Only You"
"From Another World" duet with Dean Mochizuki
"Savannah"
Music of Daniel Barry - "To & Fro" 5:10
"Ancestors" 4:55
"Takes Two to Tango" 8:07
"Miss Leisure" 5:56
"The Hiding Place" 6:06
"Sleep Baby Sleep" 3:14
"Black Bean Boss" 5:31
"The Phoenix" 5:01
"In the Beginning" 7:56

Other Version:Red Fish Blue Fish
 Ancestors 4:55 
 Baba Rum Dum 4:44
 Suicide in B♭ 
 Still Life
 Takes Two to Tango 8:07
 In The Beginning... 7:56
 To & Fro 5:10
 Nandini 
 Chemo Receptor
 Spekeasy 3:19
The Hiding Place 6:06
Sleep Baby Sleep 3:14

References

External links
TamaraGee.com

2002 albums